The Mittelmark (German for "Middle March") is a historical region in eastern Germany that was the core territory of the Margrave of Brandenburg between the Oder and Elbe rivers. 

The name refers to the location of the territory between the Altmark (Old March) and the Neumark (New March) and it lay roughly in the area of the earlier Nordmark. 

However, the southern part of the district containing Bad Belzig did not historically belong to Mittelmark, it was instead a part of Saxony.

External links
Map of the decline of the March of Brandenburg showing Mittelmark

Geography of Brandenburg
Margraviate of Brandenburg